José Lebrún Moratinos  (19 March 1919 – 21 February 2001) was a Roman Catholic Cardinal and Archbishop of Caracas. Besides his native Spanish, he spoke Italian, Latin and French.

Early life and priesthood
He was born in Puerto Cabello, Venezuela, as the eldest of the five children. He was confirmed in his native city by Felipe Rincón González, Archbishop of Caracas. He was educated at Colegio San José, of the Brothers of the Christian Schools. He entered the Interdiocesan Seminary of Caracas, where he was taught from 1934 until 1937. He travelled to Rome to study at the Pontifical Gregorian University. He earned a licentiate in philosophy in 1941. He then started studying theology but had to leave Italy because of the Second World War. He was ordained to the priesthood on 19 December 1943. He served from 1943 until 1956 in Valencia, as a faculty member, spiritual director and rector of its seminary as well as its chaplain. He did pastoral work in several parishes and was chaplain of the local jail.

Episcopate
Pope Pius XII appointed him titular bishop of Arado and auxiliary bishop of the diocese of Maracaibo on 2 August 1956. He was consecrated exactly a month later by the Nuncio to Venezuela. He was appointed Apostolic administrator of the see of Maracaibo on 23 October 1957. He was transferred to the see of Maracay in 1958. He was transferred to the see of Valencia in Venezuela in 1962. As a bishop he attended the Second Vatican Council. Pope Paul VI appointed him as Titular Archbishop of Voncaria and Coadjutor bishop of Caracas on 16 September 1972. He was elected vice-president of the Venezuelan Episcopal conference. He succeeded to the metropolitan see of Caracas on 24 May 1980.

Cardinalate
He was created and proclaimed Cardinal-Priest of S. Pancrazio in the consistory of 2 February 1983 by Pope John Paul II. He was elected as President of the Episcopal Conference of Venezuela, serving from 1984 to 1990. He resigned the pastoral government of the Archdiocese on 27 May 1995. He lost the right to participate in a conclave upon reaching the age of 80 in 1999. He died on 21 February 2001 in Caracas. He is buried along with all the other bishops of Caracas.

Canonization
In May 2021, the Roman Catholic Archdiocese of Caracas has initiated the initial steps for his canonization process.

References
 

1919 births
2001 deaths
People from Puerto Cabello
Venezuelan cardinals
Participants in the Second Vatican Council
20th-century Roman Catholic archbishops in Venezuela
Pontifical Gregorian University alumni
Cardinals created by Pope John Paul II
Roman Catholic archbishops of Caracas
Roman Catholic bishops of Maracay
Roman Catholic bishops of Maracaibo
Roman Catholic bishops of Valencia en Venezuela
Venezuelan Roman Catholic archbishops
21st-century venerated Christians